Le isterie di Jennifer (2012) is a poetry collection by Marco Di Meco.
The volume contains 50 poems. In this work, Di Meco talks about existential themes, ancient and modern, using actual modes.

References

Italian poetry collections